This is a list of diplomatic missions of Nauru, not including its honorary consulates in Agana, Auckland, London, Honolulu, Pago Pago and New Delhi. Nauru is the smallest republic in the world.  It was previously quite wealthy, thanks to royalties collected from phosphate mining.  This allowed the country of 12,000 to expand its public service workforce to 1,600.

Economic mismanagement has forced the Nauruan government to cut back on its overseas presence.  With mounting debts it was forced to relinquish Nauru House in Melbourne, a 52-story building owned by the Nauru government which housed its consulate-general. In a bid to stay solvent a covertly funded Nauran embassy was planned to be opened in Beijing as a transit point for defecting North Korean scientists (Operation Weasel).

Asia

Taipei (Embassy)

 Bangkok (Consulate General)

Oceania

 Canberra (High Commission)
 Brisbane (Consulate General)

 Suva (High Commission)

Multilateral organisations
 
New York City (Permanent Mission)

See also
 Foreign relations of Nauru
 Operation Weasel

References

Permanent Mission of Nauru to the United Nations

Nauru
Diplomatic missions